20 år med oss – Vem é dé du vill ha is a compilation album from the singers Kikki Danielsson, Elisabeth Andreassen and Lotta Engberg, who then sang together as the trio "Kikki, Bettan & Lotta". It was released on 8 March 2002 and sold gold in Norway and Sweden, in Norway this happened the second week after it released there. The album reached number three on the Norwegian Albums Chart.

"Vem é dé du vill ha" is the only song on this album that the trio sing together all three. However, the album also contains songs who Kikki Danielsson and Elisabeth Andreassen sang together in the Swedish pop group "Chips" in the early 1980s. The album also contained four new songs, "Vem é dé du vill ha" by Kikki, Bettan & Lotta, "Hela världen öppnar sig" and "Klia mej på ryggen" by Lotta and "Easy Come, Easy Go" and "Jag har börjat leva nu" by Kikki. However, "Klia mej på ryggen" was a cover version, where the original was in the Danish language and named "Klo meg lidt på ryggen".

Track listing

Charts

References

2002 compilation albums
Kikki, Bettan & Lotta compilation albums
Swedish-language compilation albums
Mariann Grammofon compilation albums
Albums produced by Bert Karlsson